The Geib Company was a family business which under various partnership names, produced and sold pianofortes, organs, and sheet music in New York City in the nineteenth century.

History
Johannes Geib (John Geib, Sr.) was an organ maker from Staudernheim, Germany. Trained there, he resettled to England about 1760 to practice his craft. He first worked with established firms, and later with Lenkfeld as a partner. There he was awarded several patents for innovative piano mechanisms such as the grasshopper action. Marrying an English woman, they had twins John Jr. and Adam ca.1780, George ca 1782, and William ca. 1793. In 1797 he elected to resettle again, to New York. There he established Geib & Company as an organ maker from 1800 to 1802. Following a bankruptcy, he partnered with his son John Jr. to operate Geib & Son, building organs and pianofortes until 1814. John Jr. had another partnership with brother Adam as J. & A. Geib from 1804 to 1808 and again 1816–17.

References

Publishing companies based in New York City
Sheet music publishing companies
Pipe organ building companies
Piano manufacturing companies of the United States
Musical instrument manufacturing companies based in New York City
Defunct manufacturing companies based in New York City